Serolidae is a family of isopod crustaceans, containing the following genera :

Acanthoserolis Brandt, 1988
Acutiserolis Brandt, 1988
Atlantoserolis Wägele, 1994
Basserolis Poore, 1985
Brazilserolis Wägele, 1994
Brucerolis Poore & Storey, 2009
Caecoserolis Wägele, 1994
Ceratoserolis Cals, 1977
Cristaserolis Brandt, 1988
Frontoserolis Brandt, 1991
Glabroserolis Menzies, 1962
Heteroserolis Brandt, 1991
Leptoserolis Brandt, 1988
Myopiarolis Bruce, 2009
Neoserolis Wägele, 1994
Paraserolis Wägele, 1994
Sedorolis Bruce, 2009
Septemserolis Wägele, 1994
Serolella Pfeffer, 1891
Serolina Poore, 1987
Serolis Leach, 1818
Spinoserolis Brandt, 1988
Thysanoserolis Brandt, 1991

The family Serolidae encompasses 22 genera with 109 species. These species are exclusively marine and are distributed across the marine realms as follows: one species can be found in the Temperate Northern Atlantic, one species in the Temperate Northern Pacific, seven species in the Tropical Atlantic, six species in the Central Indo-Pacific, 16 species in Temperate South America, one species in Temperate Southern Africa, 20 species in Temperate Australasia, and 31 species in the Southern Ocean.

References

Sphaeromatidea
Crustacean families